Wolfgang Bubenik (born 31 March 1981) is an Austrian football player who plays for ATSV Rüstorf. He formerly played for FC Blau-Weiss Linz and SV Pasching.

References

Living people
Austrian footballers
FC Blau-Weiß Linz players
FC Juniors OÖ players
FC Kärnten players
LASK players
Austrian Football Bundesliga players
1987 births
Association football midfielders
Association football defenders